Hemiphractus scutatus, also known as Spix's horned treefrog, is a species of frog in the family Hemiphractidae. It is found in the upper Amazon basin in Bolivia, western Brazil, Peru, Ecuador, and southern Colombia.

Its natural habitat is tropical moist lowland forest. It is a cryptic species. Although no significant threats have been found, habitat loss may locally affect it. There are several protected areas within its range.

References

Scutatus
Amphibians of Bolivia
Amphibians of Brazil
Amphibians of Colombia
Amphibians of Ecuador
Amphibians of Peru
Amphibians described in 1824
Taxa named by Johann Baptist von Spix
Taxonomy articles created by Polbot